The Lady of Ascot is a 1930 crime novel by the British writer Edgar Wallace. It is a loose novelisation of Wallace's 1921 play M'Lady about a woman attempting to raise her daughter in high society whose plans are threatened by the return of her husband who has been serving a sentence at Broadmoor for the murder of a police officer.

References

Bibliography
 Amnon Kabatchnik. Blood on the Stage, 1975-2000: Milestone Plays of Crime, Mystery, and Detection : an Annotated Repertoire. Rowman & Littlefield, 2012.

1930 British novels
Novels by Edgar Wallace
British crime novels
Hutchinson (publisher) books